Novoselivske (Монтанай; , Fraydorf) (until 1944 Fraydorf) is an urban-type settlement in Rozdolne Raion (district) of the Autonomous Republic of Crimea, a territory recognized by a majority of countries as part of Ukraine and occupied by Russia as the Republic of Crimea. As of the 2001 Ukrainian Census, its population was 3,186. Current population:

See also
 Rozdolne, the other urban-type settlement in Rozdolne Raion of Crimea

References

Urban-type settlements in Crimea
Rozdolne Raion